Netherlands competed at the 2019 European Games, in Minsk, Belarus from 21 to 30 June 2019. Netherlands has previously competed at the 2015 European Games in Baku, Azerbaijan, where it won 29 medals, including eight golds.

Medalists

| width="78%" align="left" valign="top" |

| width="22%" align="left" valign="top" |

Archery

Recurve

Compound

Badminton

Basketball 3x3

Team roster

Men
Mack Bruining
Jaouad Darib
Jan Driessen
Lenno Witteveen

Women
Janis Boonstra
Laura Cornelius
Janine Guijt
Rowie Jongeling

Summary

Boxing

Men

Women

Cycling

Road
Men

Women

Track
Sprint

Team sprint

Keirin

Omnium

Madison

Time trial

Endurance

Gymnastics

Acrobatic
Mixed

Women

Artistic
Women

Trampoline

Judo

Men

Women

Mixed event

Karate

Kumite
Men

Sambo

Key:
 ML – Minimal advantage by last technical evaluation
 MT – Minimal advantage by technical points
 VH – Total victory – painful hold
 VO – Victory by technical points – the loser without technical points
 VP – Victory by technical points – the loser with technical points
 VS – Total victory by decisive superiority
 VT – Total victory – total throw

Women

Shooting

Men

Women

Mixed team

Table tennis

Wrestling

Key:
 VFA – Victory by fall
 VFO – Victory by forfeit
 VIN – Victory by injury
 VPO – Victory by points – the loser without technical points
 VPO1 – Victory by points – the loser with technical points
 VSU – Victory by technical superiority – the loser without technical points and a margin of victory of at least 8 (Greco-Roman) or 10 (freestyle) points
 VSU1 – Victory by technical superiority – the loser with technical points and a margin of victory of at least 8 (Greco-Roman) or 10 (freestyle) points

Women's freestyle

References

Nations at the 2019 European Games
European Games
2019